The electoral district of Pittsworth was a Legislative Assembly electorate in the state of Queensland, Australia.

History
Pittsworth was created in the 1910 redistribution, taking effect at the 1912 state election, and existed until the 1923 state election. Most of its area was based on the Cambooya which was abolished at the 1912 election.

When Pittsworth was abolished in 1923, its area was incorporated into the district of Aubigny.

Members

The following people were elected in the seat of Pittsworth:

References

Former electoral districts of Queensland
1912 establishments in Australia
1923 disestablishments in Australia
Constituencies established in 1912
Constituencies disestablished in 1923